Several theorems are named after Augustin-Louis Cauchy.  Cauchy theorem may mean:

Cauchy's integral theorem in complex analysis, also Cauchy's integral formula
Cauchy's mean value theorem in real analysis, an extended form of the mean value theorem
Cauchy's theorem (group theory)
Cauchy's theorem (geometry) on rigidity of convex polytopes
The Cauchy–Kovalevskaya theorem concerning partial differential equations
The Cauchy–Peano theorem in the study of ordinary differential equations

Augustin-Louis Cauchy